Under Your Skin is the seventh studio album by American rock band Saliva. It is the final album to feature singer Josey Scott, who left the band in 2012. It was released on March 22, 2011. Prior to release, the album had been titled both Take That Society and Skin Deep.

History
In September 2009, Scott said the album was "coming along nicely". So far, he had written about nine songs and the rest of the band - which at the time of the interview included guitarist Wayne Swinny, bassist Dave Novotny, drummer Paul Crosby, and guitarist Jonathan Montoya  – had been writing material as well.

On January 12, 2011 Tunelab reported that the title of the upcoming Saliva album has changed again, from Skin Deep to Under Your Skin. The album was released on March 22, 2011. The first single from the album, "Nothing", impacted radio on January 25 and was released for digital download on February 1.

"Badass" became the album's second single. It was released on March 8, 2011. It went on to enjoy more success than the album's first single, "Nothing," by peaking at No. 26 on Billboard's Mainstream Rock Tracks. "Badass" was also featured in the film Saw 3D.

"Under Your Skin" was released on March 22, 2011. It debuted at No. 86 in the U.S. Billboard 200, higher than Saliva's previous studio album, "Cinco Diablo", which peaked at No. 104 on the same chart.

Track listing

Other tracks
A week before the album was released, the band put the entire album up on their website for streaming. On the first day two songs were listed as well as streamed and "Spotlight" was not.
"Get Out Alive" - 3:40
"The Key" - 4:06

Personnel
Josey Scott - lead vocals, acoustic guitar, percussion
Wayne Swinny - guitars, backing vocals
Dave Novotny - bass, backing vocals
Paul Crosby - drums

Charts

Weekly charts

Singles

References

Saliva (band) albums
2011 albums